Reinhold Bernt (19 December 1902 – 26 October 1981) was a German film actor.

Bernt was born Reinhold Bienert in Berlin and died in West Berlin.

Career 
Bernt's acting career began in Stuttgart with a theater debut. Soon after, he traveled to Berlin. There, he founded a troupe known as the "Group of Young Actors" with his brother, Gerhard Bernt. He performed across Berlin and entered the film industry in the 1930s. he was not only an actor, but also an assistant director and screenwriter. He appeared in some Nationalist Socialist propaganda films, such as Im Namen des Volkes (In the Name of the People). After World War II, he performed at the Schillertheater and in Deutsche Film-Aktiengesellschaft (DEFA). It became harder to obtain large roles, so he began to act increasingly as supporting characters. eventually, he moved on to voicing radio plays, performing a total of 320 roles. He passed away on October 26, 1981 in Berlin.

Selected filmography

 The Blue Angel (1930) - Der Clown / The Clown
 Salto Mortale (1931) - Jim
 The Other Side (1931) - Feldwebel
 The Daredevil (1931) - Willy, Stallmeister American Hyppodrom
 Kadetten (1931) - Hennig, Bursche bei Rittmeister von Malzahn
 Secret Agent (1932) - Baschin
 Peter Voss, Thief of Millions (1932) - Zeitungsverkäufer
 Kavaliere vom Kurfürstendamm (1932) - Gorritz
 Spione im Savoy-Hotel (1932) - Schrott, sein Sekretär
 Secret of the Blue Room (1932) - Chauffeur Max
 Sacred Waters (1932) - Töni
 The Rebel (1932) - Krahvogel
 Hände aus dem Dunkel (1933) - Schnabel, ein entlassener Angestellter
 The Roberts Case (1933)
 The Rebel (1933) - George Bird
 Hitlerjunge Quex (1933) - Ausrufer (barker) (uncredited)
 Lady Windermere's Fan (1935) - Regisseur
 Trouble Backstairs (1935) - August Krüger, Hausverwalter
 Fruit in the Neighbour's Garden (1935) - Gottfried Berger, Theos Freund
 The Beggar Student (1936) - Der Pedell
 Escapade (1936) - Prowiak, ein Friseur
 Thunder, Lightning and Sunshine (1936) - Franzl, Schneidergeselle
 Under Blazing Heavens (1936) - 1. Offizier auf der Gorboduc
 Truxa (1937) - Gepäckträger (uncredited)
 Sherlock Holmes (1937) - Wilson
 Hahn im Korb (1937) - Hotelportier
 The Mystery of Betty Bonn (1938) - Matrose Clements
 Comrades at Sea (1938) - Kommissar Sakin
 Mordsache Holm (1938) - Kriminalassistent Henneberg
 In the Name of the People (1939) - Bruno Mielke
 Der grüne Kaiser (1939) - (uncredited)
 The Governor (1939) - Mitglied der Radikalen Partei
 Mistake of the Heart (1939) - Dr. Reithofer
 Central Rio (1939) - Sergeant Carmo
 Alarm at Station III (1939) - Kai, Schmuggler
 Jud Süß (1940) - Folterknecht
 Wunschkonzert (1940)
 Blutsbrüderschaft (1941) - Arbeiter der Gösch
 Das himmelblaue Abendkleid (1941)
 Alarm (1941) - Wirt im Lokal
 Unser kleiner Junge (1941) - Swoboda
 Carl Peters (1941) - Jungle Patrolman Hansen
 Leichte Muse (1941) - Kaufmann Böhlke
 Menschen im Sturm (1941)
 Sein Sohn (1942) - Heini - Komplize des 'eleganten' Diebs
 ... und über uns der Himmel (1947)
 The Berliner (1948) - (uncredited)
 Rotation (1949) - Kurt Blank
 Bürgermeister Anna (1950) - Landrat
 Semmelweis - Retter der Mütter (1950)
 Die Jungen vom Kranichsee (1950) - Fabrikdirektor
 Master of Life and Death (1955) - Bahnwärter
 The Story of Anastasia (1956) - Oberwachtmeister Schröder (uncredited)
 Spy for Germany (1956) - U-Boot-Steuermann
 Madeleine und der Legionär (1958)
 Arzt ohne Gewissen (1959) - Hauptwachtmeister
 Two Among Millions (1961) - Schliemke
 Destination Death (1964) - Willi Wirth

Bibliography
 Kosta, Barbara. Willing Seduction: The Blue Angel, Marlene Dietrich, and Mass Culture. Berghahn Books, 2009.
 St. Pierre, Paul Matthew. E.A. Dupont and his Contribution to British Film: Varieté, Moulin Rouge, Piccadilly, Atlantic, Two Worlds, Cape Forlorn. Fairleigh Dickinson University Press, 2010.

References 

 Bernt, Reinhold, in: Ernst Klee: Das Kulturlexikon zum Dritten Reich. Wer war was vor und nach 1945. Frankfurt am Main : S. Fischer, 2007, ISBN 978-3-10-039326-5, S. 47

External links

1902 births
1981 deaths
German male film actors
Male actors from Berlin
20th-century German male actors